Tillandsia subulifera is a species of flowering plant in the genus Tillandsia. This species is native to Costa Rica, Nicaragua, Panama, Trinidad, Colombia, Venezuela, and Ecuador.

References

subulifera
Flora of Central America
Flora of South America
Flora of Trinidad and Tobago
Epiphytes
Plants described in 1919